Léonie Cambours (born 31 July 2000) is a French athletics competitor. She competed in the women's pentathlon at the 2022 World Athletics Indoor Championships held in Belgrade, Serbia.

She won the bronze medal in the women's high jump event at the French Athletics Championships held in Albi, France.

International competitions

References

External links 
 

Living people
2000 births
Place of birth missing (living people)
French pentathletes
French female high jumpers
French female long jumpers
21st-century French women